Exchange Lifeguards (American title: Wet and Wild Summer!) is a 1992 Australian-American comedy film directed by Maurice Murphy and starring Christopher Atkins, Julian McMahon and Elliott Gould.

Plot
A property developer wants to take over an Australian beach for a high rise resort. He sends his son to Australia to check out the situation, posing as an exchange lifeguard. He falls in love with a woman who owns the land his father needs for the development and finds himself sympathising with the locals.

Cast 

Christopher Atkins as Bobby McCain
Julian McMahon as Mick Dooley
 Rebecca Carlton as Julie Thomas
 Vanessa Steele as Charlene
Elliott Gould as Mike McCain
Richard Carter as Al Eastman
 Amanda Newman-Phillips as Kylie
 Christopher Pate as Richard Gray
 Lois Larimore as Donna McCain
 Brian M. Logan as Terry
Mark Hembrow as Max
 Peter Gow as Tishi
 Anthony Lawrence as Clint Eastman
 Ann Brisk as Annie McCain
 Rick Hochman as himself

Production
Avalon says that sales agent Dick Bateman suggested he write and produce a film set around the beach and lifeguards, with humour and a romance. Bateman said he would buy all rights for $1.5 million. Avalon wrote a script Gary Hamilton of Beyond agreed to help finance if Avalon could get Elliott Gould and Chris Atkins to star; Avalon succeeded in doing this and the film was made for $1.6 million.

Reception   
In her review of the film Marsha Porter describes the film as a "vulgar Aussie version of Frankie-and-Annette beach movies" and as  "sexist, badly acted, and buffoonish".

See also
Cinema of Australia

References

External links

Exchange Lifeguards at Oz Movies

1992 films
1990s thriller films
Australian thriller films
1990s English-language films
Films directed by Maurice Murphy
1990s Australian films